was a Japanese conductor and flautist.

Biography
Tadashi Mori performed as flautist in his young days. He studied conducting from Hideo Saito, and started his career as conductor.

He was a music director and principal conductor of the Tokyo Metropolitan Symphony Orchestra in 1967–72, and permanent conductor of the Kyoto Symphony Orchestra in 1963–66. In 1967, he became the first music director of the Tokyo Symphony Orchestra, and made base as profesional orchestra.

References

1921 births
1987 deaths
20th-century conductors (music)
20th-century Japanese male musicians
Japanese conductors (music)
Japanese male conductors (music)
Musicians from Tokyo